Ivezaj is a surname. Notable people with the surname include:

Sokol Baci Ivezaj, Albanian rebel
Tringe Smajl Martini Ivezaj, Albanian rebel
Mondi Ivezaj, Albanian Leader and rebel leader in the Great Illryian Revolt